"Wanna Get to Know You" is a song recorded by G-Unit. It was released in January 2004 through Interscope Records and 50 Cent's G-Unit Records as the third single from their 2003 debut album, Beg for Mercy.

Background
The song was released to radio stations on January 13, 2004. The song features R&B singer Joe, who sings the chorus. The first verse of the song is rapped by Young Buck, followed by Lloyd Banks, and the final verse is rapped by 50 Cent. The song is produced by Red Spyda, and heavily samples Marvin Gaye's song, "Come Live with Me Angel". The song peaked at number 15 on the Billboard Hot 100.

Track listing
 Promo CD single
 "Wanna Get To Know You" (LP version)
 "Angels"
 "Angels" (Instrumental)
 "Wanna Get To Know You" (Enhanced CD Video)

Music video
The music video's setting(s) change for each verse. G-Unit (Young Buck, The Game, 50 Cent and Lloyd Banks) appears in a backstreet alley throughout the video. Young Buck appears at a bar/club with The Game for his verse, seducing a woman while there. Lloyd Banks is in a taxi cab making love to a woman while the taxi cab driver looks on for the second verse. 50 Cent is at a beach party and making love to a woman on the sand for the third and final verse.

Chart positions

Weekly charts

Year-end charts

Release history

References

2004 singles
G-Unit songs
Music videos directed by Jessy Terrero
Contemporary R&B ballads
2003 songs
Songs written by Marvin Gaye
Songs written by 50 Cent
Songs written by Lloyd Banks
G-Unit Records singles
Interscope Records singles
Songs written by Tony Yayo
Songs written by Joe (singer)